The 2020–21 Estonian Cup was the 31st season of the Estonian main domestic football knockout tournament. FCI Levadia won their tenth title, and qualified for the 2021–22 UEFA Europa Conference League.

First Round (1/64)
First round matches were played between 22 July and 12 August.

Second round (1/32)
Second round matches were played between 28 July and 11 August.

Third round (1/16)
Third round matches were played between 10 September and 14 October.

Fourth round (1/8)
Fourth round matches were played between 20 October 2020 and 23 January 2021.

Quarter-finals
Quarter-final matches were played 9-25 March 2021.

Semi-finals
The draw for the semi-finals was made on 17 March 2021.

Final

References

External links
 Official website 

Estonian Cup seasons
Cup
Estonian
2021 in Estonian football